Belphegor the Mountebank is a 1921 British silent film directed by Bert Wynne and starring Milton Rosmer, Kathleen Vaughan and Warwick Ward. It is based on the play Belphegor, the mountebank : or, Woman's constancy from the 1850s by Charles Webb. Webb's own play was a translation and adaptation of Adolphe d'Ennery's and Marc Fournier's Paillasse.

Plot
The plot centres on the character Belphegor, a nobleman by birth whose life circumstances change and who is forced to take up the life of a traveling showman.

Cast
Milton Rosmer as Belphegor
Kathleen Vaughan as Pauline de Blangy
Warwick Ward as Laverennes
Nancy Price as Countess de Blangy
Margaret Dean as Madeleine
Peter Coleman as Fanfaronade
Leal Douglas as Catherine
R.Heaton Grey as Comte de Blangy
A.Harding Steerman as Duc de Sarola

References

External links
 
 Belphegor the Mountebank at BFI Film & TV Database
 Belphegor the Mountebank at Silent Era

1921 films
1921 drama films
British black-and-white films
British silent feature films
Films directed by Bert Wynne
Ideal Film Company films
British drama films
1920s English-language films
1920s British films
Silent drama films